Scoparia parachalca is a moth in the family Crambidae. It was described by Edward Meyrick in 1901. It is endemic to New Zealand.

The wingspan is about 17 mm. The forewings are dark fuscous, with a few fine whitish scales. The subbasal, first and second lines are indicated by broad golden-bronzy suffusion and the terminal area is suffused with golden-bronzy. The hindwings are dark fuscous, but darker posteriorly. Adults have been recorded on wing in December.

References

Moths described in 1901
Scorparia
Moths of New Zealand
Endemic fauna of New Zealand
Taxa named by Edward Meyrick
Endemic moths of New Zealand